Đurađ Jakšić (born 22 July 1977) is a Serbian historian and politician.

Career
He ran for mayor of Novi Sad in the 2012 and 2016 mayoral elections. Jakšić is the Serbian Radical Party president of the city council of Novi Sad.

In December 2012, he arose controversy by forming a petition requesting a street in Novi Sad be named after Slobodan Milošević. He previously arose controversy in March 2007 when he suggested that Veljko Milanković and Mladen Bratić get streets named after them in Novi Sad.

References

1977 births
Living people
People from Drniš
Politicians from Novi Sad
Serbs of Croatia
21st-century Serbian historians
Writers from Novi Sad
Serbian Radical Party politicians
University of Novi Sad alumni